The following is a list of United States ambassadors to the Organisation for Economic Co-operation and Development in Paris, France. The official title for the position is the Representative of the U.S.A to the Organisation for Economic Cooperation and Development, with the rank of Ambassador. In the absence of an ambassador, the Deputy Permanent Representative assumes the role of interim Permanent Representative and heads USOECD as Chargé d'Affaires. Former Delaware governor Jack Markell was confirmed as Ambassador on September 18, 2021. Markell was the first appointee under President Joe Biden.

Office holders
The following is a chronological list of those who have held the office:

Notes

References

External links
 United States Mission to the Organization for Economic Co-operation and Development
 United States Mission listing of U.S. ambassadors to the Organization for Economic Co-operation and Development
the u

Organisatipon for Economic Co-operation and Development
United States–European relations